The Pirates is an opera by composer Stephen Storace with an English libretto by James Cobb. The work was partly adapted from Storace's 1786 opera Gli equivoci and is remarkable as affording one of the earliest instances of the introduction of a grand finale into an English opera. The work premiered at the Haymarket Theatre on November 21, 1792. The opera became a huge success and is considered by many music critics to be Storace's best composition. It was chosen as the starring prima buffa to be performed for King George III at the King's Theatre, London on 16 May 1794.

Roles

Musical numbers

Act I
 "Overture" – The Orchestra
 Chorus: "Thanks to the brisk and fav'ring gale" - chorus of sailors and lazzaroni
 Air: "Of a vile lack of honesty Grumblers complain" - Genariello
 Air: "Some device my aim to cover" - Altador
 Duet: "Signor! Signor!" - Fabulina and Altador
 Air: "Oh! the pretty creature!" - Blazio
 Air: "Love, like the opening flower" - Aurora
 Trio: "Past toils thus recompensing" - Guillermo, Aurora, Altador
 Finale: "Peaceful slumb'ring on the ocean" 

Act II
 Trio: "To hear our suit do not refuse" - Aurora, Fabulina, Gasparo
 Air: "There, the moon-silver'd waters roam" - Guillermo
 Air: "A saucy knave who pass'd the door" - Fabulina
 Air: "Oh dear! What shall I do?" - Blazio
 Glee: "Let mirth and joy appear" - Fabulina, Marietta, etc.
 Air: "Memory repeating" - Altador
 Air: "In childhood's careless happy day" - Fidelia
 Second Finale: "Unhand me, cowards, give me way" - Altador, etc.

Act III
 Chorus: "To the vineyard's praise, the chorus raise" - chorus of vintagers 
 Air: "My rising spirits thronging" - Fidelia 
 Air: "As wrapt in sleep I lay" - Aurora 
 Air: "No more his fears alarming" - Fabulina 
 Chorus: "Our faith thus pledg'd, join hand to hand" - chorus and Guillermo 
 Air: "Scarcely had the blushing morning" - Altador 
 Duet: "The jealous Don won't you assume when you marry?" - Fabulina and Blazio
 Air: "Careful the winding path explore" - Marietta 
 Trio: "We the veil of fate undraw" - Fabulina, Fidelia, and Altador
 Trio: "Oh! softly flow thou briny tide - Fabulina, Fidelia, and Altador
 Finale: "Now constancy its meed shall gain" - 

Storace reused some of the music from his 1785 opera Gli sposi malcontenti in The Pirates.

Later productions
On 29 November 1827, the opera was revived at Drury Lane with the title Isidore de Merida.  Most of Storace's music was retained but set to a new libretto, probably due to the original libretto's lack of publication.

References

Works consulted

External links

 (vocal score)

Operas
1792 operas
English-language operas
Operas by Stephen Storace